Conostylis androstemma (common name trumpets) is a tufted perennial plant species in the family Haemodoraceae. It is endemic to the south-west of Western Australia. Plants grow to between 10 and 30 cm high and produce cream to pale yellow flowers between May and August in the species' native range.

Description
Conostylis androstemma has green, hairless, terete leaves which are 10 to 30 cm long and about 1 mm in diameter. The flower has stems (pedicels) that are  less than 1 mm long,  and bracts which are about 5 mm long and  2 mm wide. The cream to pale yellow perianth is hairy and radially symmetrical It is 30–50 mm long with a tube which is usually straight. The lobes are not reflexed and are 15 to 25 mm long. There are six stamens, all at the one level. The filaments are 8–17 mm long and the yellow anthers 3–5.5 mm long and without an appendage. The style is 30–50 mm long.

It flowers from May to August.

The plant resprouts from its rhizomes, after fire.

It is easily distinguished from Conostylis argentea by its terete hairless leaves.

Habitat
It grows in lateritic gravel and yellow sand on screes and hilltops,

Distribution
It occurs in south-western Western Australia from Kalbarri National Park to Perth and York.

Taxonomy
Originally named Androstemma junceum and described by John Lindley in 1840 in A Sketch of the Vegetation of the Swan River Colony, the species was assigned to the genus Conostylis by botanist Ferdinand von Mueller in 1873 in Fragmenta Phytographiae Australiae and renamed Conostylis androstemma.

References

Commelinales of Australia
Angiosperms of Western Australia
Plants described in 1873
Taxa named by Ferdinand von Mueller
androstemma